The collared warbling finch (Poospiza hispaniolensis) is a species of bird in the family Thraupidae. It is found in Ecuador and Peru.

Its natural habitats are subtropical or tropical dry shrubland, subtropical or tropical moist shrubland, subtropical or tropical high-altitude shrubland, and heavily degraded former forest.

References

collared warbling finch
Birds of Ecuador
Birds of Peru
collared warbling finch
collared warbling finch
Taxonomy articles created by Polbot